Oak Crest, also known as Cutchin Home and Holland-Cutchin House, is a historic home located at Franklin, Isle of Wight County, Virginia. The main block was built between 1799 and 1810, and is a two-story, three bay, single-pile, side-passage plan frame dwelling in the Federal style. Later additions include a -story rear ell added about 1810, and -story wings built in 1900 and 1935.  Also on the property are the contributing smokehouse, poultry shelter (c. 1930), horse barn (c. 1930), and pumphouse (c. 1930).

It was listed on the National Register of Historic Places in 1999.

What is Federal Style Architecture
 European Neoclassicism 
 Classical Revival / Roman Classicism
 Definition of Federal-style architecture

References

Houses on the National Register of Historic Places in Virginia
Federal architecture in Virginia
Houses completed in 1810
Houses in Isle of Wight County, Virginia
National Register of Historic Places in Isle of Wight County, Virginia